Anthony Colella (born 12 July 1975) is an Australian former professional rugby league footballer who played for Manly-Warringah, Canberra and South Sydney in the National Rugby League.

Biography
Colella played 43 first-grade games with Manly from 1995 to 1999. He was a member of the Manly side which lost the 1997 Grand Final to Newcastle. Primarily a back rower, he featured in the grand final as a hooker, due to the suspension of teammate Jim Serdaris.

In 2000 and 2001 he played for the Canberra Raiders, making 28 first-grade appearances.

Following a season at South Sydney in 2002, Colella moved to England to play for Huddersfield in Super League VIII, but was forced to retire from football early in the season with a knee injury.

References

External links
Anthony Colella at Rugby League project

1975 births
Living people
Australian rugby league players
Manly Warringah Sea Eagles players
Canberra Raiders players
South Sydney Rabbitohs players
Huddersfield Giants players
Rugby league second-rows